Silkwood Park is located in the Northwood community in the city of Irvine in Orange County, California, USA. The park sits next to Westwood Basics Plus Elementary School and Sierra Vista Middle School.

References 

Geography of Irvine, California
Parks in Orange County, California
Municipal parks in California